Neil Blair is an English literary agent, television producer, and film producer.

Early life
Neil Blair studied law at Exeter College, Oxford.

Career
In 1990, after graduating from college, Blair joined the litigation team at the global law firm Linklaters. He later joined Warner Bros. Entertainment, where he became Head of Business Affairs, Europe, worked on productions such as Band of Brothers and Eyes Wide Shut, and helped acquire the film rights for J.K. Rowling’s Harry Potter series. In 2001 he left to join the Christopher Little Literary Agency.
In 2011, Blair left Christopher Little Literary Agency to found The Blair Partnership. J.K. Rowling joined his client list after 15 years with the Christopher Little Literary Agency.

He is the Chairman of the Board and a Director of Pottermore and Chairman of the production companies Brontë Film and Television, founded to develop and produce projects commissioned from J.K. Rowling’s novels, and Snowed-In Productions, founded to work on non J.K. Rowling projects.

Charitable work
Blair is Chairman of J.K. Rowling’s children’s charity Lumos. He is a UK ambassador for The Abraham Initiatives and a board member of JW3. In 2017, he supported the construction of archive space and a reading room on Exeter College’s Cohen Quadrangle to help preserve 30,000 rare books, including important Judaica such as the Soncino Bible, the earliest full text bible ever printed.

Personal life
Neil has said that books and being Jewish "are very close to my heart". He is a fan of West Ham and Saracens.

Filmography

References

British Jews
Living people
Year of birth missing (living people)